Vegas Abajo is a rural barrio in the municipality of Adjuntas, Puerto Rico.

History
Puerto Rico was ceded by Spain in the aftermath of the Spanish–American War under the terms of the Treaty of Paris of 1898 and became an unincorporated territory of the United States. In 1899, the United States Department of War conducted a census of Puerto Rico finding that the combined population of Guayo barrio and Vegas Abajo barrios was 1,275.

See also

 List of communities in Puerto Rico

References

External links

Barrios of Adjuntas, Puerto Rico